Edmond Beavor (died 1745) was a captain in the British Royal Navy.

Life
Very bad weather scattered the fleet; several of the convoy were lost, and the Stromboli, demasted and in an almost sinking condition, just managed to get into Kinsale harbour.

There she was refitted, and arrived in the Downs on 21 December. Towards the end of the next year he was appointed to the frigate , and during the spring and summer of 1745 was employed cruising, with some success, against the Dunkirk privateers in the North Sea. In September he was in Leith Roads, assisting the transport of the army, and in stopping, so far as possible, the communications of the rebels. On the evening of the 21st, after the defeat of Sir John Cope's army in the morning, the Fox became a place of refuge for numbers of the soldiers who could not get into the castle, the town gates being held by the enemy. Beavor's position was not an easy one for a young officer; for he had no instructions, and did not know how far his authority extended.

The rebels were in possession of Leith, and would not allow him to communicate with the shore, even to get fresh provisions. On 6 October he wrote that there were 1,200 rebels quartered in Leith; and though he thought that a few shot might dislodge them, he was not certain that it would meet with their lordships' approval. A few weeks later he put to sea on a cruise, and in a violent storm the Fox went down with all hands, 14 November 1745.

References

DNB references
These references are found in the DNB article referred to above.

External links

Year of birth missing
1745 deaths
Royal Navy officers
18th-century Royal Navy personnel